C-C motif chemokine ligand 27 is a protein that in humans is encoded by the CCL27 gene.

Function 

This gene is one of several CC cytokine genes clustered on the p-arm of chromosome 9. Cytokines are a family of secreted proteins involved in immunoregulatory and inflammatory processes. The CC cytokines are proteins characterized by two adjacent cysteines. The protein encoded by this gene is chemotactic for skin-associated memory T lymphocytes. CCL27 is associated with homing of memory T lymphocytes to the skin, and plays a role in T cell-mediated inflammation of the skin. CCL27 is expressed in numerous tissues, including gonads, thymus, placenta and skin. It elicits its chemotactic effects by binding to the chemokine receptor CCR10.  The gene for CCL27 is located on human chromosome 9. Studies of a similar murine protein indicate that these protein-receptor interactions have a pivotal role in T cell-mediated skin inflammation. [provided by RefSeq, Sep 2014].

References

Further reading 

 
 
 
 
 
 
 
 

Cytokines